Malik is an indigenous Kram (clan) of Kashmiri speaking people in Kashmir valley. This Kram originates from the former aristocratic ruling families of Kashmir valley which belonged to various existing dominant krams of Kashmir valley mostly during Shahmir Sultanate. Kashmiri indigenous Muslim Malik ruling families mostly belonged to Dar, Raina, Magray, Bhat (Butt) and Ittu Krams (clans). However a lot of Kashmiri Malik families are also descended from neighboring tribes like Bhatti and Khokhar who were closely allied to Shahmir Sultans and Mughal rulers of Kashmir and were offered lands inside the Kashmir valley.

Kashmiris with Malik Title 

Malik Tazi Bhat
Yasin Malik

References 

Surnames of Indian origin
Indian names
Social groups of Jammu and Kashmir
Pakistani names
Kashmiri-language surnames
Kashmiri tribes